Joan Cynthia Harrison (later Breetzke, born 29 November 1935) is a retired South African swimmer who won the 100 m backstroke event at the 1952 Olympics.

Harrison's mother was a swimmer and her father played rugby. Joan went to Clarendon High School for Girls in East London. At age 13, she held three junior and two senior national records, and two national senior swimming titles. In 1950, aged 14, she won the 440 yd freestyle at the British Empire Games, beating the previous games record by 13 seconds and finishing 7 seconds ahead of other competitors, and was declared the outstanding woman swimmer of the games. She won two more gold medals at the 1954 British Empire and Commonwealth Games. In 1982 she was inducted into the International Swimming Hall of Fame.

See also
 List of members of the International Swimming Hall of Fame

References

External links
 

1935 births
Living people
Sportspeople from East London, Eastern Cape
South African female backstroke swimmers
South African female freestyle swimmers
South African female swimmers
Olympic swimmers of South Africa
Swimmers at the 1952 Summer Olympics
Swimmers at the 1950 British Empire Games
Swimmers at the 1954 British Empire and Commonwealth Games
Olympic gold medalists for South Africa
Medalists at the 1952 Summer Olympics
Commonwealth Games gold medallists for South Africa
Commonwealth Games silver medallists for South Africa
Commonwealth Games bronze medallists for South Africa
South African people of British descent
Olympic gold medalists in swimming
Commonwealth Games medallists in swimming
Alumni of Clarendon High School for Girls
20th-century South African women
21st-century South African women
Medallists at the 1950 British Empire Games
Medallists at the 1954 British Empire and Commonwealth Games